Crevedia Mare is a commune located in Giurgiu County, Muntenia, Romania

The commune is located about 20 km west of Bucharest and 2 km south of Trans Europe Motorway E70/A1.  It is composed of six villages: Crevedia Mare, Crevedia Mică, Dealu (Golășei until 1964), Găiseanca, Priboiu and Sfântu Gheorghe.

Natives
 Nicolae Crevedia

References

External links 

Communes in Giurgiu County
Localities in Muntenia